Rohan Bopanna and Florin Mergea were the defending champions, but lost to Jean-Julien Rojer and Horia Tecău in the final, 4–6, 6–7(5–7).

Seeds
All seeds receive a bye into the second round.

Draw

Finals

Top half

Bottom half

References
 Main Draw

Men's Doubles